San Marino competed at the 2016 Winter Youth Olympics in Lillehammer, Norway from 12 to 21 February 2016.

Alpine skiing

Boys

See also
San Marino at the 2016 Summer Olympics

References

2016 in Sammarinese sport
Nations at the 2016 Winter Youth Olympics
San Marino at the Youth Olympics